Bois-de-Boulogne station is a commuter rail station operated by Exo in Montreal, Quebec, Canada. It is served by  the Saint-Jérôme line.

Origin of name
Bois-de-Boulogne takes its name from the nearby Collège de Bois-de-Boulogne, itself named for park Bois de Boulogne in France.

From the opening of the Saint-Jérôme Line in 1997 until 2000, the name of this station was Henri-Bourassa.  It was renamed on January 1, 2001 to avoid confusion with the Henri-Bourassa Metro station.

Location
The station is located at 1000, boulevard Henri-Bourassa Ouest in Montreal. Its closest major intersection is Henri Bourassa Boulevard and Bois-de-Boulogne.

Connecting bus routes

Nearby points of interest
 Cégep Bois-de-Boulogne
 SAAQ

References

External links

  Bois-de-Boulogne Commuter Train Station Information (RTM)
 Bois-de-Boulogne Commuter Train Station Schedule (RTM)
 2016 STM System Map
 STL 2011 map

Exo commuter rail stations
Railway stations in Canada opened in 1997
Railway stations in Montreal
Ahuntsic-Cartierville
1997 establishments in Quebec